Cervonema is a genus of nematodes belonging to the family Comesomatidae.

The genus has almost cosmopolitan distribution.

Species:

Cervonema allometricum 
Cervonema brevicauda 
Cervonema chilensis 
Cervonema donghaensis 
Cervonema gourbaulti 
Cervonema hermani 
Cervonema jenseni 
Cervonema kaikouraensis 
Cervonema longispicula 
Cervonema macramphis 
Cervonema memorabile 
Cervonema minutus 
Cervonema multispira 
Cervonema papillatum 
Cervonema proberti 
Cervonema proximamphidum 
Cervonema pseudodeltensis 
Cervonema shiae 
Cervonema tenuicaudatum

References

Nematodes